Thomas Alexander van Straubenzee (born 1982) is an English businessman, property consultant, and real estate agent. Van Straubenzee is known for his connection to the British royal family and as the godfather of Princess Charlotte of Wales.

Early life and education 
Van Straubenzee is the son of Captain Alexander van Straubenzee, formerly of the Royal Green Jackets and Claire Fenwick, daughter of Anthony Fenwick, of Eaton Grange, Grantham, Lincolnshire. He is a grandson of Lieutenant-Colonel Henry van Straubenzee. The van Straubenzee family are members of the landed gentry of Spennithorne, North Yorkshire; originally from the Netherlands, their ancestor Captain Philip William Casimir van Straubenzee was naturalised as British subject in 1759. They have a strong military tradition. He attended Ludgrove School, where he was a schoolmate and close friend of the Prince of Wales, and Prince Harry, Duke of Sussex. He later attended Harrow School. He is the older brother of Charlie van Straubenzee. In 2002 another younger brother, Henry, was killed in a car accident. The funeral was attended by members of the British royal family. In June 2005, Thomas accompanied Prince William on his royal tour to New Zealand.

Career 
Van Straubenzee worked as a chartered surveyor with Strutt & Parker before co-founding VanHan with Rory Penn in 2012, a high-end residential and commercial real estate firm. His company was later acquired by Knight Frank. In March 2018 he became the head of Knight Frank's Global Wealth Advisory team.

Charity 
Van Straubenzee is a patron of the Henry van Straubenzee Memorial Fund, a charity founded in honour of his late younger brother Henry.

Van Straubenzee sits on the Philanthropy Board for the Royal Albert Hall, London.

Personal life 
Van Straubenzee is one of the five godparents of Princess Charlotte of Wales, the second child and only daughter of the Prince and Princess of Wales.

Van Straubenzee married Lady Melissa Percy, daughter of the 12th Duke of Northumberland, at St Michael's Church, Alnwick on 22 June 2013. They divorced in March 2016 on the grounds of van Straubenzee's "unreasonable behaviour".

On 24 July 2020, van Straubenzee married the assistant head teacher at Princess Charlotte and Prince George's school Lucy Lanigan-O'Keeffe, daughter of barrister Stephen Lanigan-O'Keeffe and sister of Irish Olympic pentathlete Arthur Lanigan-O'Keeffe. The Lanigan-O'Keeffe family were landed gentry in County Tipperary. They have a daughter, Mary van Straubenzee, born October 2020.

References 

British real estate businesspeople
English people of Belgian descent
English people of Dutch descent
People educated at Ludgrove School
People educated at Eton College
Thomas
Living people
1982 births